Sngap Syiem College, often abbreviated as SSC, is an educational institution established in 1985. It was named after Sngap Sing Syiemlieh a renowned freedom fighter and tribal chief of Hima Maharam during the British era.
This college is situated at South West Khasi Hills District, Mawkyrwat, in Meghalaya. Sngap Syiem College was the first college of Mawkyrwat area. This college is affiliated with the North Eastern Hill University. This college offers Higher Secondary courses and Degree courses in Arts, Commerce and Science streams.

References

External links
http://sngapsyiemcollege.in

Universities and colleges in Meghalaya
Colleges affiliated to North-Eastern Hill University
Educational institutions established in 1985
1985 establishments in Meghalaya
South West Khasi Hills district